The 1924 United States presidential election in Florida was held on November 4, 1924. Voters chose six representatives, or electors to the Electoral College, who voted for president and vice president.

Background 
Ever since the disfranchisement of blacks at the beginning of the 1890s, Florida had effectively been a one-party state ruled by the Democratic Party. The disfranchisement of blacks and poor whites by poll taxes in 1889 had left the Republican Party – between 1872 and 1888 dependent upon black votes – virtually extinct.

With the single exception of William Howard Taft’s win in Calhoun County in 1908 the Democratic Party won every county in Florida in every presidential election from 1892 until 1916. Only twice – and never for more than one term – did any Republican serve in either house of the state legislature between 1896 and 1928. Despite this Democratic dominance and the restrictions on the franchise of the poorer classes due to the poll tax, significant socialist movements developed and persisted in Tampa and to a lesser extent over other parts of the state, especially against the powerful Ku Klux Klan. There was also a powerful Prohibitionist movement in older North Florida, which saw the Prohibition Party even win the governorship for one term under the notorious anti-Catholic minister Sidney J. Catts.

The 1920 presidential election saw Warren Harding, aided substantially by isolationist sentiment in the region, gain more support in the former Confederacy than any Republican since black disfranchisement, in the process winning three Florida counties.

Vote 
Owing to a decline in voter turnout, and an easing of isolationist feelings, Coolidge was unable to match Harding’s percentage of the vote. However, vis-à-vis Harding's performance in this one-party southern state, Coolidge’s losing margin was 2.53 percentage points smaller, and he did make small gains amongst the small but increasing flow of Northeastern migrants moving to Florida’s hot climate. Although he did not manage to hold Broward County or Osceola County, where Harding gained pluralities in 1920, Coolidge did become the first Republican to ever carry Pinellas County.

Despite the fact that the Republican Party had never gained 31 percent of Florida’s vote in a presidential election since the poll tax was introduced, 1924 remains, the last time a Republican presidential candidate has won an election without carrying Florida. Passionate anti-Catholic feelings in the Piney Woods region would turn the presidential electoral votes of this one-party state against urban Catholic Al Smith in 1928, and the state went on to become largely a bellwether in presidential elections. Since 1928 it has only backed a losing presidential candidate three times, each time a Republican: Richard Nixon in 1960, George H. W. Bush in 1992, and Donald Trump in 2020. Given that Bush and Trump were incumbent presidents and Nixon would be elected president eight years later, 1924 also marks the last time Florida voted for a candidate who never won the presidency. It also marks the last time that Florida voted against an incumbent president who successfully won another term.

Florida proved to be the strongest state for Prohibition Party candidate Herman Faris, who won 5.04% of the popular vote, and even came with 5% of winning Dade County, ahead of Coolidge and Follette.

Results

Results by county

References

Notes 

Florida
1924
1924 Florida elections